Colin Brooks is a drummer from Little Rock, Arkansas, USA. He has played for numerous bands including Ho-hum, Trusty, The Big Cats, and Samiam. Brooks also played drums on the Dan Zanes and Friends album Catch That Train!, which won the 2007 Grammy Award for Best Musical Album for Children. He would go on to play drums live for Zanes.

Brooks returns to Little Rock frequently to play with his rock band, The Big Cats, with his old friends Burt Taggart, Jason White and Josh Bentley. Brooks co-wrote the song "2nd Street" for White's band Pinhead Gunpowder, which appeared on the album Compulsive Disclosure.

Brooks joined the Canadian indie rock band The Stills before their 2006 album, Without Feathers. He is currently the drummer for Samiam.

Previous bands
BETTY (drums, "BETTY RULES" the off-Broadway musical, 2002–2003)
The Numbskulz (drums, 1988–1990)
Substance (drums, 1990–1994)
Sint (drums, 1991–1992)
Shatner (drums, 1991)
G (bass guitar, 1992–1993)
Carbondale (drums, 1993)
The Big Cats (drums, 1993–present)
Pretty (drums, 1993–1994)
Red Forty (guitar, 1994–1996)
ho-hum (drums, 1997)
Trusty (touring drummer, 1995)
Sea Ray (drums, 2001–2004)

References

American indie rock musicians
Musicians from Little Rock, Arkansas
Year of birth missing (living people)
Living people
Samiam members